College lacrosse is played by student-athletes at colleges and universities in the United States and Canada. In both countries, men's field lacrosse and women's lacrosse are played at both the varsity and club levels. College lacrosse in Canada is sponsored by the Canadian University Field Lacrosse Association (CUFLA) and Maritime University Field Lacrosse League (MUFLL), while in the United States, varsity men's and women's lacrosse is governed by the National Collegiate Athletic Association (NCAA), National Junior College Athletic Association (NJCAA) and National Association of Intercollegiate Athletics (NAIA). There are also university lacrosse programs in the United Kingdom sponsored by British Universities and Colleges Sport (BUCS) and programs in Japan.

In the U.S., as of the 2021–22 academic year, there were 74 NCAA-sanctioned Division I men's lacrosse teams, 75 Division II men's lacrosse teams, and 247 Division III men's lacrosse teams. There are 120 Division I women's lacrosse teams, 114 Division II women's lacrosse teams, and 291 Division III women's lacrosse teams. There were also 21 men's programs and 11 women's programs at two-year community colleges organized by the National Junior College Athletic Association (NJCAA) and a growing number of National Association of Intercollegiate Athletics (NAIA) four-year small college programs.

As of 2016–17, there were 184 collegiate men's club teams competing through the Men's Collegiate Lacrosse Association (MCLA), including most major universities in the United States without NCAA men's programs, organized into two divisions and ten conferences. Schools that feature an NCAA Division I FBS football team must play in Division 1, while most other teams compete in Division 2. There are 225 collegiate club teams for women organized by the Women's Collegiate Lacrosse Associates (WCLA).

History of college lacrosse

The first intercollegiate game in the United States was played on November 22, 1877 between New York University and Manhattan College. Lacrosse had been introduced in upstate New York in the 1860s. Lacrosse was further introduced to the Baltimore area in the 1890s. These two areas continue to be hotbeds of college lacrosse in the U.S. An organizing body for the sport, the U. S. National Amateur Lacrosse Association, was founded in 1879. The first intercollegiate lacrosse tournament was held in 1881, with Harvard beating Princeton, 3–0, in the championship game. New York University and Columbia University also participated. In 1882 three colleges formed a league called the Intercollegiate Lacrosse Association (ILA), which four other colleges soon joined. From this point through 1931, collegiate lacrosse associations chose an annual champion based on season records.  In 1894, the Inter-University Lacrosse League (IULL) began play using slightly different rules.

The two leagues merged in December 1905 to form the 8-team United States Intercollegiate Lacrosse League. The USILL was a closed-membership league, which excluded several lacrosse powers, such as the U.S. Naval Academy.  The national championship was officially bestowed only upon teams that were included in the membership of these organizations. In 1912, the USILL established Northern and Southern Divisions and began conducting a post-season playoff. Harvard defeated Swarthmore, 7–3, in the first formal playoff. This system continued through 1925.  As Navy was not a member of the USILL, its teams were not eligible for the championship, even though Navy had the best collegiate record in many of those years.  Navy was undefeated from 1917 through 1923, a stretch of 40 games with one tie.

The USILL was replaced by the United States Intercollegiate Lacrosse Association in March, 1926, as an open-membership governing body. Six more teams became new USILA members, in addition to the former USILL teams. The USILA bestowed gold medals upon the teams that it selected as national champions through the 1931 season. No official champions were named from 1932 through 1935. In 1936, an award was established in the memory of a Baltimore sportswriter to recognize annually the most outstanding teams. From 1936 through 1972, the USILA executive board awarded the Wingate Memorial Trophy to the national champions.

From at least 1951, if not earlier, lacrosse divisions were officially named after legendary lacrosse-men.  These were the Cy Miller, Laurie D. Cox, and Roy Taylor Divisions. They were more commonly referred to Division I, or A; Division II, or B; and Division III, or C.  All college teams were placed in one of the three divisions, dependent upon their records, schedules, and success for the preceding five years, and a point system was created.  Any team of the three divisions was eligible to win the national championship, but this was virtually impossible for non-Division I teams. A Division II team, playing several Division I teams, might have been able to achieve it. A team's record was required to include six games against teams in its own division. Teams were realigned every three years, again reflecting their records. All schools were eligible for the national rankings. The team that achieved the highest point total each year, however, was not guaranteed a solo national championship. The system served as guidance to the USILA executive board, who chose co-champions on frequent occasions.  This point system prevailed with modifications until the NCAA in the early 1970s established the playoff system for determining champions.

At its 1969 annual meeting in Baltimore, the United States Intercollegiate Lacrosse Association voted for its first playoff tournament to determine a national champion. In 1971, the NCAA began sponsoring men's lacrosse and began holding an annual championship tournament for Division I schools. The USILA conducted a small college tournament for non-Division I schools in 1972 and 1973.  In 1974, the NCAA took over the sponsorship of this tournament through the 1979 season, with separate tournaments being conducted in both 1980 and 1981 for Divisions II and III teams.  The Division II tournament then was discontinued until returning in 1993.
Michael Brown, LSM/D, holds record for attending every NJCAA school besides for Onondaga CC.

Participation & Growth
Lacrosse is one of the fastest growing sports in America, at the collegiate level. Across both men’s and women’s collegiate athletic programs, lacrosse experienced greater growth in the number of teams than any other sport. The number of women’s lacrosse teams more than doubled between 2003 and 2023, rising from 256 to 541 teams. Men’s lacrosse experienced nearly a 70% increase during the same 20-year period, increasing from 236 to 398 teams. The growth across all three NCAA lacrosse Divisions has increased the scholarships available to students seeking to continue playing lacrosse at the collegiate level.

Lacrosse is one of the least diverse sports in America. In 2021, it was reported that ethnically white lacrosse players make up 72.8% of the total lacrosse population, followed by 8.9% Black or African American and 7.5% Latino or Hispanic players. At the collegiate level specifically, white women’s lacrosse players make up 84% of the population and 85% of men’s lacrosse players population. 7% of men’s lacrosse head coaches and 10% of women’s lacrosse head coaches are non-white ethnicities across all divisions.

Scholarships 
According to NCAA, 51% of student athletes receive athletic aid in some capacity. The NCAA limits the number of scholarships that can be awarded to any athletic team. Not every team is fully-funded, and for teams that are not fully funded, there are even fewer scholarships that can be awarded. The funding per team is not public information, so players must communicate with coaches about whether they are eligible and will be awarded an athletic scholarship Ivy league schools do not provide athletic scholarships in any capacity. 

Lacrosse is an equivalency scholarship sport, meaning that coaches pool the scholarship money they are provided and award it to both new recruits and current players. This model is different than a headcount sport, where every member of the team is guaranteed a full-ride scholarship. Combining an academic merit scholarship with athletic performance scholarships is how students have the opportunity to achieve a full ride in equivalency sports.

NCAA men's lacrosse 
The National Collegiate Athletic Association (NCAA) is the largest association and governing body of collegiate athletics in the United States. The NCAA holds lacrosse championships for all three Divisions in men's and women's lacrosse. As of the 2022 season (2021–22 school year), the NCAA has 396 men's lacrosse programs and 525 women's lacrosse programs.

Division I men's lacrosse 

In the 2022 season, Division I men's lacrosse had the smallest number of teams compared to the Division II and Division III levels. This distinction passed to Division II men's lacrosse for 2023. The most recent 2022 NCAA lacrosse season involved 74 NCAA Division I men's lacrosse teams organized into 11 conferences. The number of D-I teams increased to 76 in the 2023 season, but the number of conferences dropped to 10. These teams are heavily concentrated in the Northeast and Mid-Atlantic regions, and only five teams are not in the Eastern Time Zone (Air Force, Denver, Lindenwood, Marquette, and Utah).

From 1936 through 1970 the United States Intercollegiate Lacrosse Association (USILA) selected the Wingate Memorial Trophy winners as national champions based on regular season records.  Beginning in 1971, the National Collegiate Athletic Association began holding an annual championship tournament. Cornell took the first title over Maryland, 12–6. Syracuse has 11 Division I titles (*one vacated later), Johns Hopkins 9, Virginia (7) and Princeton 6. The NCAA national championship weekend tournament normally draws over 80,000 fans. The most recent national champions from 2022 are the Maryland Terrapins.

The most recent change to the conference lineup was announced during the 2022 NCAA tournament when the Atlantic 10 Conference (A-10) made official its widely-rumored sponsorship of men's lacrosse effective in the 2023 season. This move, along with other moves during the early-2020s conference realignment, led to the Northeast Conference and Southern Conference dropping men's lacrosse after the 2022 season.

Two men's lacrosse schools started transitions from Division II to Division I in July 2022. Lindenwood and Queens (NC) are playing men's lacrosse in the ASUN Conference, with Queens as a full member and Lindenwood as an affiliate. Hartford began a transition from Division I to Division III in the 2021–22 school year; the 2023 season will be its last in Division I before joining the Commonwealth Coast Conference in July 2023.

In September 2018 the NCAA rules committee implemented an 80-second shot clock that begins upon possession. A team must advance the ball across midfield within the first 20 seconds, and then 60 seconds to shoot the ball once across midfield. The clock will only reset if the ball hits the goalie or the post. Failure to score before the shot clock runs out results in a change of possession.

Conferences
 America East Conference

 ASUN Conference

 Atlantic Coast Conference

 Atlantic 10 Conference

 Big East Conference

 Big Ten Conference

 Colonial Athletic Association

 Independents

 Ivy League

 Metro Atlantic Athletic Conference

 Patriot League

Division II men's lacrosse 

Division II lacrosse is made up of 75 teams, mainly located in the Northeast and Southeast. The USILA conducted a "small college" lacrosse championship tournament in 1972 and 1973. Division II men's lacrosse held its first NCAA tournament in 1974 with an eight-team bracket. The format remained the same until 1980, when the field dropped to just two teams as the Division III tournament was inaugurated. From 1982 through 1992, a Division II playoff was not conducted. In 2001, a four-team bracket was instituted.  The Division II men’s lacrosse championship bracket expanded from four to eight teams starting with the 2013 season. Adelphi University currently holds the record for the number of D-II championships, with seven and also appeared in the championship a record 11 times.

NCAA Division II lacrosse programs are organized into eight conferences, as well as independent programs consisting of mainly new D-II lacrosse teams. The newest addition to the roster of Division II men's lacrosse conferences came in 2017–18 when the Great Lakes Valley Conference began sponsoring men's lacrosse.

On December 2, 2014; the University of Alabama In Huntsville (UAH) announced the additional of Men's and Women's Lacrosse programs. These programs began competition with the 2016 season, initially as independents.

The most recent Division II men's national champions are the Tampa Spartans.

Conferences:
 Central Atlantic Collegiate Conference

 Conference Carolinas

 East Coast Conference

 Great Lakes Valley Conference

 Great Midwest Athletic Conference

 Independents

 Northeast-10 Conference

 Rocky Mountain Athletic Conference

 South Atlantic Conference

 Sunshine State Conference

Division III men's lacrosse 

The majority of schools playing NCAA men's lacrosse play in Division III, with 247 in all. Most Division III lacrosse teams are located in the Northeast, with only seven programs west of the Mississippi River. The USILA conducted a "small college" championship in 1972 and 1973. The NCAA Division III championship originally was combined with Division II from 1974–1979, before the NCAA split the non-Division I schools into separate Division II and III tournaments in 1980. Hobart has made a record 15 appearances in the championship game and won a total of 13 championships. Hobart lacrosse also won the championship the first 12 years it was held from 1980–1991. The 12 consecutive championships are an NCAA record but Hobart has not won again since 1993, and now plays at the Division I level. Salisbury University now follows closely with 12 non-consecutive championships and 17 appearances.

NCAA Division III lacrosse programs are organized into 24 conferences and over 20 independent programs.

The defending Division III national champions are the RIT Tigers.

Conferences:

 Allegheny Mountain Collegiate Conference

 Centennial Conference

 Coast to Coast Athletic Conference

 College Conference of Illinois and Wisconsin

 Colonial States Athletic Conference

 Commonwealth Coast Conference

 Empire 8

 Great Northeast Athletic Conference

 Heartland Collegiate Athletic Conference

 Independents

 Landmark Conference

 Liberty League

 Little East Conference

 Middle Atlantic Conference

 Michigan Intercollegiate Athletic Association

 Midwest Lacrosse Conference

 New England Collegiate Conference

 New England Small College Athletic Conference

 New England Women's and Men's Athletic Conference

 North Atlantic Conference

 North Coast Athletic Conference

 Ohio Athletic Conference

 Old Dominion Athletic Conference

 Presidents' Athletic Conference

 Skyline Conference

 Southern Athletic Association

 Southern Collegiate Athletic Conference

 State University of New York Athletic Conference

 United East Conference

 USA South Athletic Conference

NCAA women's lacrosse 

Women's college lacrosse differs significantly from men's lacrosse in terms of rules and equipment. The NCAA holds lacrosse championships for all three divisions and currently has 524 women's lacrosse programs. Women's collegiate lacrosse was originally governed by the U.S. Women's Lacrosse Association, which joined with the Association for Intercollegiate Athletics for Women (AIAW) to determine an annual champion. The USWLA and AIAW conducted championships from 1978–1982 before being usurped by the NCAA. The NCAA began sponsoring a Division III championship in 1985 and added a Division II championship in 2001.

Division I women's lacrosse 

The NCAA began sponsoring a women's lacrosse championship in 1982. Lacrosse has grown into 120 NCAA Division I women's lacrosse teams organized into 15 conferences. Only 12 programs are located outside the Eastern Time Zone—Northwestern, Vanderbilt, Denver, six Pac-12 Conference members, and three California schools outside the Pac-12. Of these 12 schools, only Denver also sponsors varsity men's lacrosse.

The most recent change to the lineup of women's lacrosse conferences came during the 2021 offseason, when the Mountain Pacific Sports Federation (MPSF) and Southern Conference (SoCon) dropped women's lacrosse. The MPSF, which had previously dropped to three women's lacrosse schools when the Pac-12 Conference established a women's lacrosse league, lost one of them when Fresno State dropped the sport, leaving San Diego State and UC Davis to become independent. Both played as independents in the 2022 season, and will remain such in 2023 until joining Pac-12 women's lacrosse after that season. The three full SoCon members that sponsored the sport (Furman, Mercer, Wofford) became single-sport members of the Big South Conference, while the two associate members, Coastal Carolina and Delaware State, rejoined ASUN Conference women's lacrosse.

Six schools will start Division I play in the 2023 season. Three existing D-I members are launching new teams in that season—Clemson will compete in its all-sports home of the ACC; Fairleigh Dickinson will compete in its all-sports home of the Northeast Conference (NEC), and Xavier will play as an independent before joining its full-time home of the Big East Conference in the 2024 season. Three others began transitions from D-II to D-I in July 2022. Lindenwood and Queens (NC) will play women's lacrosse in the ASUN Conference, with Queens as a full member and Lindenwood as an associate member, while Stonehill will play in its new full-time home of the NEC. The 2023 season is the last for Hartford in Division I competition; it will play that season as an independent before joining the Division III Commonwealth Coast Conference.

The 2024 season will also see the debut of South Florida in its full-time home of the American Athletic Conference. Two schools will debut in the 2025 season—Charlotte in The American, which it joins in 2023, and Rhode Island in its full-time home of the Atlantic 10 Conference.

The defending Division I national champions are the North Carolina Tar Heels.

Conferences:
 America East Conference

 American Athletic Conference

 ASUN Conference

 Atlantic 10 Conference

 Atlantic Coast Conference

 Big East Conference

 Big South Conference

 Big Ten Conference

 Colonial Athletic Association

 Independents

 Ivy League

 Metro Atlantic Athletic Conference

 Mid-American Conference

 Northeast Conference

 Pac-12 Conference

 Patriot League

Division II women's lacrosse 
A total of 114 programs compete at the Division II level. Division II women's lacrosse is one of the newest championships sponsored by the NCAA.  The first Division II women's lacrosse championship was held in 2001, when C.W. Post beat West Chester 13–9. Since then, the Division II level has been dominated, much like its men's counterpart, by Adelphi University with nine national championships, most recently in 2019. 

The 114 NCAA Division II women's lacrosse programs are organized into 10 conferences, as well as independent programs.

The defending Division II national champions are the Indianapolis Greyhounds.

Conferences:
 Central Atlantic Collegiate Conference

 Conference Carolinas

 East Coast Conference

 Great Lakes Valley Conference

 Gulf South Conference

 Independents

 Mountain East Conference

 Northeast-10 Conference

 Pennsylvania State Athletic Conference

 Rocky Mountain Athletic Conference

 South Atlantic Conference

 Sunshine State Conference

Division III women's lacrosse 

The NCAA Division III level is made up of 291 women's lacrosse teams. It is the largest women's lacrosse division and also the largest NCAA lacrosse division, surpassing the number of men's Division III teams by 44 members.

The defending Division III national champions are the Middlebury Panthers.

Conferences:

 Centennial Conference

 College Conference of Illinois and Wisconsin

 Coast to Coast Athletic Conference

 Colonial States Athletic Conference

 Commonwealth Coast Conference

 Empire 8

 Great Northeast Athletic Conference

 Independents

 Landmark Conference

 Liberty League

 Little East Conference

 Massachusetts State Collegiate Athletic Conference

 Middle Atlantic Conference

 Midwest Women's Lacrosse Conference

 New England Collegiate Conference

 New England Small College Athletic Conference

 New England Women's and Men's Athletic Conference

 New Jersey Athletic Conference

 North Atlantic Conference

 North Coast Athletic Conference

 Ohio Athletic Conference

 Ohio River Lacrosse Conference

 Old Dominion Athletic Conference

 Skyline Conference

 Southern Athletic Association

 Southern California Intercollegiate Athletic Conference

 Southern Collegiate Athletic Conference

 State University of New York Athletic Conference

 United East Conference

 USA South Athletic Conference

NAIA lacrosse 

As of October, 2016, There are a 39 National Association of Intercollegiate Athletics (NAIA) schools that offer men’s and/or women’s varsity lacrosse, Lacrosse is an officially recognized sport by the NAIA. NAIA programs are currently in year two of NAIA invitational sport status.  During this phase of recognition, teams compete to participate in a post season championship called the NAIA National Invitational.  Each conference and A.I.I group receive one automatic qualifier with the remaining four bids going to the highest remaining teams from the NAIA national ranking.  NAIA programs also regularly compete against NCAA DII and DIII teams.  The Wolverine-Hoosier Athletic Conference (WHAC) announced on January 27, 2012, the addition of lacrosse for both men and women as conference sports effective the fall of 2012. The WHAC was the first conference in the NAIA to offer lacrosse as a conference championship sport.  The Appalachian Athletics Conference and the Kansas Collegiate Athletic Conference recognized lacrosse as a conference sport in the Fall of 2015.

NJCAA lacrosse 

The National Junior College Athletic Association (NJCAA) is the primary governing body of community college athletic programs in the USA and currently oversees 21 men's and 11 women's lacrosse programs predominately in the Northeastern United States. The NJCAA lacrosse programs do not compete in their regular conferences, but instead are ranked within their NJCAA Regions. The NJCAA has sponsored a men's lacrosse championship since 1970 and a women's lacrosse championship since 2004.  There are also new lacrosse programs at community colleges that are not members of the NJCAA, such as the California Community College Athletic Association, which does not sponsor the sport at this time.

Men's club lacrosse

Men's Collegiate Lacrosse Association (MCLA) 

The Men's Collegiate Lacrosse Association (MCLA), formerly known as the US Lacrosse Men’s Division of Intercollegiate Associates (USL MDIA), is a national organization of non-NCAA, college men's lacrosse programs. The MCLA was created by the MDIA Board of Directors and its creation was announced by US Lacrosse on August 24, 2006. The MCLA oversees play and conducts national championships for 184 non-NCAA men's lacrosse programs in 10 conferences and in two divisions throughout the country.

The defending National Champions at the MCLA Division 1 Level are the Grand Canyon University Antelopes. The Division II National Champions are the Concordia-Irvine Eagles.

Conferences:
 Central Collegiate Lacrosse Association
 Great Rivers Lacrosse Conference
 Lone Star Alliance
 Pacific Northwest Collegiate Lacrosse League
 Pioneer Collegiate Lacrosse League
 Rocky Mountain Lacrosse Conference
 Southeastern Lacrosse Conference
 Southwestern Lacrosse Conference
 Upper Midwest Lacrosse Conference
 Western Collegiate Lacrosse League

National College Lacrosse League (NCLL) 

The National College Lacrosse League (NCLL) is a men's lacrosse league comprising mostly Eastern US college lacrosse clubs (non-varsity). There are approximately 130 teams divided into 12 conferences. The programs are split into Division I and Division II. Many of the clubs are at schools that currently have varsity NCAA Men's lacrosse programs.

Conferences:
 Blue Ridge Conference
 Capitol Conference
 Chesapeake Conference
 Deep South Lacrosse Conference
Eastern Pennsylvania Conference
 Empire East Conference
 Empire West Conference
 Keystone Conference
 Liberty Conference
 Midwest North Conference
 Midwest South Conference
 NY Metro Conference
 Tidewater Conference

Other U.S. college club lacrosse leagues 
Great Lakes Lacrosse League (GLLL)
California Junior College Lacrosse Association (CJCLA)

Women's club lacrosse

Women's Collegiate Lacrosse Associates (WCLA) 

The Women's Collegiate Lacrosse Associates (WCLA) is a collection of over 260 college club teams that compete under the US Lacrosse umbrella. Teams are organized into various leagues and two divisions. The association regulates different aspects of the teams, including minimum number of games played. A recent rule modification allows community colleges to become members. Teams that have been classified as either Division I or Division II have the opportunity to compete in a national championship each spring under US Lacrosse.
 Central Plains Women's Lacrosse League
 Central Women's Lacrosse League
 Carolina Women's Lacrosse League
 East Coast Women's Lacrosse Association
 Mid Atlantic Women's Lacrosse League
 North East Women's Lacrosse League
 Rocky Mountain Women's Lacrosse League
 Southeastern Women's Lacrosse League
 Texas Women's Lacrosse League
 Western Women's Lacrosse League
 Women's Collegiate Lacrosse League
 Women's Lacrosse Association

See also 
F. Morris Touchstone Award
Intercollegiate sports team champions#Lacrosse, Women
List of college lacrosse events
NCAA Men's Division I Lacrosse Records
NCAA Division I Men's Lacrosse Championship
NCAA Division II Men's Lacrosse Championship
NCAA Division III Men's Lacrosse Championship
NCAA Division I Women's Lacrosse Championship
NCAA Division II Women's Lacrosse Championship
NCAA Division III Women's Lacrosse Championship
USILA All-American Team
U.S. Lacrosse
US Lacrosse Women's Division Intercollegiate Associates

References

External links
 Lacrosse (men's) at NCAA
 Lacrosse (women's) at NCAA